The BFS Cup, commonly known as the Cup of Serbia, or the League Cup of Serbia, is the 2nd-tier national basketball cup of Serbia. It is run by the Basketball Federation of Serbia.

Prior to 2006, the Cup was organized as a state cup of Serbia, within Serbia and Montenegro (formerly FR Yugoslavia).

Title holders

 2006–07 Radnički 034 Group
 2007–08 Zdravlje Actavis
 2008–09 Metalac
 2009–10 Radnički Basket
 2010–11 Radnički Basket
 2011–12 Radnički FMP
 2012–13 Metalac
 2013–14 Borac Mozzart Sport
 2014–15 Vršac Swisslion
 2015–16 FMP
 2016–17 Dynamic BG
 2017–18 Zlatibor
 2018–19 Novi Pazar
 2019–20 Sloboda Užice
 2020–21 Vojvodina
 2021–22 Borac Zemun

The finals

Performance by club

Notes

Previous editions of the Cup of Serbia

1992–2006 

The Cup of Serbia, was a state basketball cup of Serbia, Serbia and Montenegro, until 2006. It was run by the Basketball Federation of Serbia and Montenegro.

Title holders
 1992–93 not available
 1993–94 not available
 1994–95 not available
 1995–96 not available
 1996–97 not available
 1997–98 not available
 1998–99 not available
 1999–00 Sloga
 2000–01 not available
 2001–02 not available
 2002–03 Ergonom
 2003–04 Lavovi 063
 2004–05 NIS Vojvodina
 2005–06 Atlas

1945–1959 

The Cup of Serbia, was a state basketball cup of Serbia within Federal People's Republic of Yugoslavia.

Title holders
 1946 not available
 1947 not available
 1948 not available
 1949 not available
 1950 Crvena zvezda
 1951 Not held
 1952 Crvena zvezda
 1953 Crvena zvezda
 1954 not available
 1955 Crvena zvezda
 1956 not available
 1957 not available
 1958 not available

See also
 Radivoj Korać Cup
 Basketball League of Serbia

References

External links
 

 
Basketball cup competitions in Serbia
Basketball cup competitions in Europe
Basketball competitions in Serbia and Montenegro
Recurring sporting events established in 2006
2006 establishments in Serbia